Novafrontina is a genus of dwarf spiders that was first described by Alfred Frank Millidge in 1991.

Species
 it contains three species:
Novafrontina bipunctata (Keyserling, 1886) (type) – Ecuador, Peru
Novafrontina patens Millidge, 1991 – Colombia
Novafrontina uncata (F. O. Pickard-Cambridge, 1902) – Mexico to Brazil

See also
 List of Linyphiidae species (I–P)

References

Araneomorphae genera
Linyphiidae
Spiders of North America
Spiders of South America